Sara Errani and Roberta Vinci were the defending champions, but chose not to participate in doubles.
Anastasia Pavlyuchenkova and Lucie Šafářová won the title, defeating Cara Black and Marina Erakovic in the final, 6–2, 6–4.

Seeds
The top four seeds receive a bye into the second round.

Draw

Finals

Top half

Bottom half

References
Main Draw

Mutua Madrid Openandnbsp;- Women's Doubles
Women's doubles